Matthew Laurence MacKenzie (7 July 1924 – March 2010) was a Scottish professional footballer who played as a wing half.

References

1924 births
2010 deaths
Footballers from West Dunbartonshire
Scottish footballers
Association football wing halves
Clydebank Athletic F.C. players
Sheffield Wednesday F.C. players
Grimsby Town F.C. players
English Football League players